Eragrostiella is a genus of Asian, African, and Australian plants in the grass family.

 Species
 Eragrostiella bifaria  (Vahl) Bor - Ethiopia, Kenya, Tanzania, Indian Subcontinent, Andaman Islands, Myanmar, Thailand, Queensland
 Eragrostiella brachyphylla (Stapf) Bor - India, Bangladesh, Sri Lanka
 Eragrostiella collettii (Stapf) Bor - Andaman Islands, Myanmar
 Eragrostiella leioptera (Stapf) Bor - Assam
 Eragrostiella lolioides (Hand.-Mazz.) Keng f. - Yunnan
 Eragrostiella nardoides (Trin.) Bor - Himalayas, Nepal, Bhutan, India

References

Poaceae genera
Chloridoideae